Karla Susana Olivares Souza (born December 11, 1985) is a Mexican actress known for her roles as Laurel Castillo on the ABC legal drama series How to Get Away with Murder and Marina Hayworth on the ABC sitcom Home Economics.

Early life and education 
Souza was born in Mexico City, Mexico, on December 11, 1985, to a Chilean father and a Mexican mother, Mónica.  Her grandmother, Elba Silva, was an assistant cook for the Rockefeller family for 20 years after immigrating to New York City from Chile in the 1960s. Having lived in Aspen, Colorado, until she was eight years old, Souza credits her grandmother's immigration to the United States as the reason she has an American passport.
Souza studied acting at Centro de Educación Artística, an acting school run by Televisa, in Mexico City. She also attended acting school in France and was part of a professional theatre company that toured throughout that country. While still in France, Souza auditioned and was selected to participate in the French reality TV show Star Academy, however, she turned down the offer after receiving an invitation to study at London's Central School of Speech and Drama.  She graduated from the school in 2008 with a Bachelor of Arts in acting. Near the end of her London studies, she received a CCP award, traditionally presented to the most promising actress in London. After being selected to go to Moscow with Anatoly Smilianski for an acting intensive, she returned to Mexico City and began acting in television and film when she was 22.

Career
Souza had her television debut in 2009 on the Mexican telenovela Verano de amor. She later starred in Mexican sitcoms Los Héroes del Norte and La Clínica. Her film roles include From Prada to Nada; in 2013, she was also in two Mexican box office hits, Nosotros los Nobles and Instructions Not Included. In 2014, Souza moved to Los Angeles to pursue English-language film and television roles. She was cast as a series regular in the Shonda Rhimes-produced legal drama series How to Get Away with Murder as law student Laurel Castillo, opposite Viola Davis. In February 2015, Souza appeared on the cover of Women's Health.

Since 2021, Souza has played Marina in the sitcom Home Economics.

Personal life
In December 2013, Souza became engaged to Marshall Trenkmann and the couple married in May 2014. Together, they have two children; daughter Gianna (born April 2018) and son Luka (born June 2020).

Souza is fluent in Spanish, English, and French.

Souza gave a TEDx talk in León, Guanajuato, on March 21, 2015, titled "Sweet are the Fruits of Adversity." It became the most-seen Spanish TEDx talk with millions of views.

In February 2018, Souza appeared on Mexican journalist Carmen Aristegui's show and revealed that she had been a victim of sexual assault. Souza stated that, when she was 22, she was raped by the director of a TV show she was working in; she did not name her attacker.

Filmography

Film

Television

Other

Awards 
National Hispanic Media Coalition "Outstanding Performance in a Television Series (How To Get Away with Murder)", 2017.

Awards and nominations

References

External links
 Official Website
 

1985 births
Living people
Actresses from Mexico City
Mexican people of Chilean descent
Mexican people of Portuguese descent
Mexican telenovela actresses
Mexican television actresses
Mexican film actresses
Mexican expatriates in the United States
Actresses from Colorado
Actresses of Chilean descent
Alumni of the Royal Central School of Speech and Drama
Mexican Christians
21st-century Mexican actresses
21st-century American women